Riverhead is the debut studio album of New Zealand band Goldenhorse, released in October 2002. Three versions were released of this album; the original in 2002, a limited edition 2-CD version in 2003, and a new edition released in 2004. The 2004 version was released to celebrate a year on the album chart and achieving double platinum sales.

Riverhead reached #1 on New Zealand's RIANZ charts and has sold over 49,000 copies, being certified Platinum three times.

Background and development 
Riverhead was largely recorded at a home studio in the rural settlement of Waiatarua, located in the Waitākere Ranges. Band member and producer Geoff Maddock noted in 2012 that the unique recording location and its tendency to be "enveloped in mist" notably influenced the album's sound. Other influences included drummer Joel Wilton's desire to experiment with various metrical rhythms as well as Maddock's parents, whose interest in classical music inspired him to incorporate instruments such as the cello on the album.

Track listing
Track listing adapted from Spotify. All tracks are written by Goldenhorse.

Personnel 
Credits adapted from CD liner notes.

Goldenhorse
Andrew Clark – guitar
Ben King – bass
Geoff Maddock – guitar
Kirsten Morrell – vocals
Joel Wilton – drums

Additional musicians
Miranda Adams – violin
Dominic Blaazer – organ
Julia Broom – viola
Simeon Broom – violin
Georgina Cooper – cello
Julia Dibley – violin
Kirk Havelock – clarinet
Angela Hay – clarinet

Rebecca Hendl – cello
Kingsley Melhuish – trumpet
Catherine Petoe – viola
Warwick Robinson – clarinet
Simone Ruggen – violin
Duncan Taylor – trombone
Isaac Tucker – percussion

Technical & design
Geoff Maddock – production
Nick Abbott – mixing, recording
Damian Alexander – album cover design
Martyn Alexander – mastering
Mark Smith – additional photography
Andrew B. White – design assembly

Charts

Weekly charts

Year-end charts

References 

Goldenhorse albums
2002 debut albums
2004 debut albums